Smile PreCure! is the ninth installment of the Pretty Cure anime television series produced by Toei Animation. It follows Miyuki Hoshizora and her friends as she helps Candy gather all the Cure Décor and stop the Bad End Kingdom from giving the  whole world the "Worst Ending". The original Japanese version aired in TV Asahi in Japan from February 5, 2012 to January 27, 2013 for 48 episodes, replacing Suite PreCure in its initial timeslot, and was succeeded by DokiDoki! PreCure. All of the songs are composed by Hideaki Takatori. The series was well-received, placing regularly in Japan's weekly top ten anime shows broadcast.

The series was adapted by Saban Brands under its SCG Characters unit, under the name Glitter Force and was released as a Netflix original series outside of Asia and in multiple languages. This version consists of 40 episodes, the first twenty of which were released on Netflix on December 18, 2015, and the second season on August 26, 2016. The dub, which was produced by Studiopolis, features changes to the character's names, terminology, catchphrases, and music. The theme song is "Glitter Force", performed by Blush, who also perform the insert songs before the closing credits that use footage of the girls in various computer animated dance sequences.

The series was made available in home media. In Japan, a Blu-ray box set by Marvelous AQL and TC Entertainment was released on October 26, 2012, in the same fashion as Suite PreCure. Standard DVD releases were also issued.

Episode list

See also

Smile Precure! the Movie: Big Mismatch in a Picture Book! - An animated film based on the series.
Pretty Cure All Stars New Stage: Friends of the Future - The fourth film in the Pretty Cure All Stars crossover series, which stars the Smile Pretty Cures.

Notes

References
General
 http://asahi.co.jp/precure/
 http://www.toei-anim.co.jp/tv/precure/

Specific

2012 Japanese television seasons
Pretty Cure episode lists